The Curl Atlantic Championship is an annual bonspiel, or curling tournament, held in Sackville, New Brunswick, that began in 2011. The purpose of the event is to better prepare High Performance Atlantic Curling Teams for the national and international stage. It will give Atlantic Teams exposure to arena ice, and allow the two winning teams to play in international events.

The championship will consist of twelve men's teams and twelve women's teams. Three teams will represent each province. In a situation where two or less teams represent a province, the vacant space will be filled by teams from remaining provinces.

Men's Champions

Women's Champions

References

Curling competitions in New Brunswick
Sackville, New Brunswick